Mark Berger may refer to:

 Mark Berger (economist) (1955–2003), director of the Center for Business and Economic Research at the University of Kentucky
 Mark Berger (judoka) (born 1954), Canadian judoka
 Mark Berger (sound engineer) (born 1943), American sound engineer and Academy Award winner